Yeon Sang-ho (born 25 December 1978) is a South Korean film director and screenwriter. He gained international popularity for working his adult animated films The King of Pigs (2011) and The Fake (2013), and the live-action film Train to Busan (2016), its animated prequel Seoul Station (2016) and live-action sequel Peninsula (2020), and first South Korean superhero film Psychokinesis (2018).

Career
Born in Seoul on December 25, 1978, Yeon Sang-ho graduated from Sangmyung University with a degree in Western Painting. He directed his first animated short film, Megalomania of D in 1997, followed by D-Day in 2000 and The Hell in 2002, then set up his own production house Studio Dadashow in 2004. His next two animated shorts The Hell: Two Kinds of Life (2006) and Love Is Protein (2008) were invited to various international film festivals. The Hell: Two Kinds of Life won the Asian Ghost Award at the Short Shorts Film Festival Asia and the Public Award for Best Film School (Short Film Battle Royal) at the 2007 Lyon Asian Film Festival, and Love Is Protein screened in competition at the 2009 Curtocircuit International Short Film Festival of Santiago de Compostela in 2009. Love Is Protein was later included in the three-short omnibus Indie Anibox: Selma's Protein Coffee. Yeon also directed the animated opening trailer for the Busan International Film Festival in 2010.

Yeon's first feature-length animation was The King of Pigs (2011), about a man who kills his wife after his business goes bankrupt, and seeks out his long-lost friend, a ghostwriter, 15 years after both had been severely bullied as adolescents in middle school. Inspired by the works of Satoshi Kon and Minoru Furuya, Yeon said the incidents in the film were drawn from his own life, and he cried while writing the screenplay. The low-budget film drew widespread critical acclaim for its raw portrayal of bullying, violence and systemic poverty (and the lifelong effects of such oppression), as well as the psychology of public attitudes toward a hero figure. It became the first Korean animated film to be invited to the Cannes Film Festival, where it screened in the 2012 Directors' Fortnight sidebar. It won numerous awards at domestic and international film festivals, including the Director's Guild of Korea Award for Best Director, CGV Movie Collage Award, and NETPAC Award at the 2011 Busan International Film Festival, the Satoshi Kon Award for Achievement in Animation and Special Mention (New Flesh Award for Best First Feature) at the 2012 Fantasia International Film Festival, and the Jury Prize at the 2013 Jameson Dublin International Film Festival.

His follow-up The Window was a 30-minute animated short depicting violence in the military, and was the first film of the Independent Short Film Release Project organized by Indiespace, an independent-only theater and Indieplug, a digital distributor of independent films. Yeon said the script (illustrated by cartoonist Choi Gyu-seok) was 100% based on his own personal experience while doing his mandatory military service. The Window won a Special Mention from the Jury at the 2013 Fantasia International Film Festival.

Yeon continued to make animation targeted at adults with dark, controversial themes that brutally and incisively explore human nature and social realism. His second feature The Fake (2013) critiqued organized religion, as a cult leader swindles rural, uneducated villagers out of their compensation money, while no one believes the local wastrel who discovers the truth (the characters were voiced by Oh Jung-se and Yang Ik-june, who previously starred in Love Is Protein and The King of Pigs). Yeon said he wrote the script in 2009 because of his political dissatisfaction regarding issues about the FTA and Four Major Rivers Project. The Fake made its world premiere at the 2013 Toronto International Film Festival, and won Best Film of AnimaFICX at the 2013 Gijón International Film Festival, Best Animated Feature Film at the 2013 Sitges Film Festival, and the FIPRESCI Award at the 2014 Korean Association of Film Critics Awards.

He then cast Ryu Seung-ryong and Shim Eun-kyung as voice actors in his third animated feature, Seoul Station (2015). Yeon said he wanted to depict society's collective rage in a "simple, powerful way" by making a zombie film in which zombies are among people protesting for the democratization of Korea.

In 2016, Yeon released his first live-action film Train to Busan, which takes place on a train to Busan as a zombie apocalypse suddenly breaks out in the country and threatens the safety of the passengers. The film was released to rave reviews, with praise given to its characters and use of social commentary. A standalone sequel Peninsula was released in 2020, also directed by Yeon.

Filmography

Feature films

Short films

Television

Awards 
2011 16th Busan International Film Festival: DGK Award for Best Director (The King of Pigs)
2014 1st Wildflower Film Awards: Best Director (The Fake)
2016 25th Buil Film Awards: Yu Hyun-mok Film Arts Award (Train to Busan)
2016 Korea Film Actor's Association Top Star Awards: Best New Director (Train to Busan)
2017 8th KOFRA Film Awards: Best Discovery of the Year (Train to Busan)
2017 53rd Baeksang Arts Awards: Best New Director (Train to Busan)

State honors

Notes

References

External links 
  
 
 
 

1978 births
Living people
South Korean film directors
South Korean screenwriters
Action film directors
South Korean animated film directors
People from Seoul